Ryan Paul Colclough (born 27 December 1994) is an English professional footballer who plays as a winger for Chesterfield.

Career

Crewe Alexandra
Colclough was born in the town of Burslem in Stoke-on-Trent. He started his career with Crewe Alexandra progressing through the academy to sign a two-year scholarship in the summer of 2011. He was promoted to the first team in September 2012, after impressing in pre-season games and for the under-21s. He made his professional debut for Crewe on 22 September 2012, in a 1–1 draw with Leyton Orient in Football League One, coming on as a substitute for Brendon Daniels. He scored his first goal for the club on 26 January 2013, in a 3–1 defeat to AFC Bournemouth. On 17 August, he scored twice in a 2–1 win against Tranmere Rovers.

On 23 November 2013 Colclough was tasered by police after becoming involved in an altercation with a night club bouncer and was subsequently found guilty of affray and ordered to pay £580 in fines and costs. After an unsuccessful trial with Wolverhampton Wanderers, on Thursday 6 August 2015 Colclough signed a new two-year contract with Crewe to take him through to the summer of 2017.

Wigan Athletic
Colclough joined Wigan Athletic in January 2016. Colclough scored his first goal for Wigan against Bury on 27 February 2016.

On 31 August 2016, Colclough joined League One side Milton Keynes Dons on a season-long loan. On 10 September 2016, Colclough scored his first goal for Milton Keynes Dons, in a 1-1 draw away to Bolton Wanderers.

On 24 September 2016, Colclough scored his first career hat-trick in a 1–4 away win over Fleetwood Town.

On 1 January 2017, Wigan Athletic activated a recall clause in Colclough's loan deal with Milton Keynes Dons and returned to his parent club. On 21 November 2017, he scored two goals before being substituted to see the birth of his son.

Scunthorpe United
On 9 August 2018, Colclough joined League One side Scunthorpe United for an undisclosed fee, signing a three-year deal.

He left the club by mutual consent on 16 October 2020, following an investigation into an assault charge.

Altrincham
On 24 November 2020, Colclough signed for National League side Altrincham whilst on bail for the assault charge. All charges were dropped after the Crown Prosecution Service ruled there was insufficient evidence for a conviction.

Chesterfield
On 12 January 2023, Colclough signed for National League side Chesterfield for an undisclosed fee, signing an 18-month deal.

Career statistics

Honours
Crewe Alexandra
Football League Trophy: 2012–13

Wigan Athletic
EFL League One: 2017–18

References

External links

1994 births
Living people
Sportspeople from Burslem
English footballers
Association football wingers
Crewe Alexandra F.C. players
Wigan Athletic F.C. players
Milton Keynes Dons F.C. players
Scunthorpe United F.C. players
Altrincham F.C. players
English Football League players
National League (English football) players
Chesterfield F.C. players